The Mountains Between Us (German:  Zwischen uns die Berge) is a 1956 Swiss romantic drama film directed by Franz Schnyder and starring Hannes Schmidhauser, Nelly Borgeaud and Peter Arens. Made in Eastmancolor, it was part of the post-war boom in heimatfilm which reached its peak around this period. However the film was a commercial failure and received a poor critical reception.

It was shot at the Rosenhof Studios in Zurich and on location around Riederalp and Kippel in Valais and in the Italian captail Rome. The film's sets were designed by the art director Max Röthlisberger .

Cast
 Hannes Schmidhauser as Beat Matter
 Nelly Borgeaud as Jacqueline Escher
 Peter Arens as Dominik Escher
 Heinrich Gretler as 	Posthalter
 Fred Tanner as 	Korporal Rémy
 Heinz Woester as	Vater Escher
 Max Haufler as 	Federico
 Alfred Schlageter as Kommandant der Garde
 Johannes Steiner as Gardekaplan
 Erwin Kohlund as 	Arzt
 Willy Frey as 	Wirt
 Rita Liechti as 	Wirtin
 Peter Markus as Gardist

References

Bibliography 
 Bock, Hans-Michael & Bergfelder, Tim. The Concise Cinegraph: Encyclopaedia of German Cinema. Berghahn Books, 2009.
 Kähler, Ursula. Franz Schnyder: Regisseur der Nation. Hier und Jetzt, 2020.

External links 
 

1956 films
1956 romantic drama films
Swiss romantic drama films
Swiss German-language films
Films directed by Franz Schnyder
Swiss black-and-white films